The Master of Works to the Crown of Scotland was responsible for the construction, repair and maintenance of royal palaces, castles and other crown property in Scotland. The main buildings were; Holyroodhouse; Edinburgh Castle; Stirling Castle; Linlithgow Palace; and Falkland Palace. The position was roughly equivalent to that of Surveyor of the King's Works in the English Royal Household. The emergence of the position reflected a shift in responsibility from the masons, or administrators in holy orders, to designers with little hands-on knowledge of stonemasonry. Earlier holders of the office were often courtiers: James Hamilton of Finnart was the king's kinsman; John Scrymgeour was a heraldic expert; while William Schaw, an administrator, was a key figure in the development of Freemasonry, itself a 'craft' having little to do with building. Later holders filled a role similar to that of architects in the modern sense. Some Masters were craftsmen; Robert Robertson, who was master of work at Stirling Castle after the execution of the aristocrat Hamilton of Finnart, was a carpenter. During the reign of James V there was also a Principal Master Wright or carpenter, John Drummond of Milnab, and as well as building works he was concerned with the artillery and its logistics.

In the 15th century, a Master of Works would be appointed to oversee an individual construction project, such as a new palace, or a rebuilding of an old one. Thus the exchequer records identify several postholders who might be regarded as accountants rather than architects. In the 16th century, during the reign of James V, the appointment of a Principal Master of Works began, with overall responsibility for all the king's works. The appointment was usually for life. Following the death of James Smith in 1714, the post became a sinecure, with a salary of £400, and the post declined in importance. In 1808 Robert Reid was named Architect and Surveyor to the King in Scotland, and he became Master of Works following the death of James Brodie in 1824. However, in 1831 the Scottish Office of Works was merged with the English Office of Works, and when Reid retired in 1840, he was not replaced. The Office of Works was later reconstituted as the Ministry of Works.

Principal Masters of Works to the Crown of Scotland
The dates given are those of their appointment. These appointments were made by the issue of a warrant recorded in the Register of the Privy Seal. William MacDowall, though acting as master of work never had a warrant, and some appointments ran concurrently.

1529: Sir James Nycholay, or Nicolson, Master of Work at Stirling Castle.
1537: John Scrymgeour
1539: Sir James Hamilton of Finnart
1541: Robert Robertson (Principal master wright in Stirling Castle)
1543: John Hamilton of Milnburn
1579: Sir Robert Drummond of Carnock
1583: William Schaw
1602–1607: Sir David Cunningham of Robertland, also Surveyor of the King's Works in England, 1604–1606. 
1607–1634: Sir James Murray of Kilbaberton
1615: Walter Murray (Assistant Master of Works)
1629–1637: Sir Anthony Alexander
1632: William Govane of Cardrona and James Murray Jr. (Assistant Masters of Works)
1637–1641: Henry Alexander, 3rd Earl of Stirling
1641: Sir John Veitch of Dawyck
1643–1644: John Carmichael
1645–1649: Sir David Carmichael of Hyndford
1649: Sir Robert Montgomery
1660–1668: Sir William Murray of Dreghorn

The office was unoccupied from 1668–1671.

1671–1678: Sir William Bruce of Balcaskie, Baronet
1678–1683: David Maitland (acting Master of Works)
1683–1788: James Smith  
1689–1700: Sir Archibald Murray of Blackbarony, Baronet
1700–1704: James Scott of Logie
1704–1705: Sir Francis Scott of Thirlestane
1705–1714: John Campbell of Mamor
1705–1717: John Urquhart of Meldrum
1707–1714: James Smith (position renewed)
1717–1743: Sir John Anstruther of Anstruther
1743–1761: George Dundas
1761–1764: William Stewart of Hartwood
1764–1768: James Duff, of the Middle Temple, London
1768–1809: Lieutenant-Colonel James Pringle
1809–1824: James Brodie of Brodie
1824–1840: Robert Reid

References

Bibliography

 
Lists of office-holders in Scotland